Azoarcus tolulyticus is a species of bacteria. It is a nitrogen-fixing bacteria. It is notable for degrading toluene. Tol-4 is its type strain.

References

Further reading

Whitman, William B., et al., eds. Bergey's manual® of systematic bacteriology. Vol. 2. Springer, 2012.

External links
LPSN

Type strain of Azoarcus tolulyticus at BacDive -  the Bacterial Diversity Metadatabase

Rhodocyclaceae
Bacteria described in 1995